The 1973 Jordanian  League (known as The Jordanian  League,   was the 23rd season of Jordan  League since its inception in 1944, In the 1973 it was called (first division league). Al-Faisaly won its 14th title.

Teams

Map

League table 

 Al-Jazeera and Al-Hussein Withdrew From the home stage, All results of both teams have been crossed out.

Overview
Al-Faysali won the championship.

References
RSSSF

External links
 Jordan Football Association website

Jordanian Pro League seasons
Jordan
Jordan
football